Candace Novoselnik ( McNamee; born June 13, 1980) is an American former indoor volleyball player.

She played for the United States women's national volleyball team, at the 2002 FIVB World Grand Prix.

Life
She played for Sidwell Friends.
She played for University of California, Berkeley. In 2013, she was assistant coach at  University of Ljubljana.

Clubs

References

External links
 Olimpia Teodora Ravenna: arriva la palleggiatrice Usa Candace McNamee at Lega Pallavolo Serie A Femminile  (English translation)
 

1980 births
Living people
American women's volleyball players
California Golden Bears women's volleyball players
African-American volleyball players
Expatriate volleyball players in Spain
Expatriate volleyball players in Germany
Expatriate volleyball players in France
Expatriate volleyball players in Italy
American expatriate sportspeople in Spain
American expatriate sportspeople in Germany
American expatriate sportspeople in France
American expatriate sportspeople in Italy
21st-century African-American sportspeople
21st-century African-American women
20th-century African-American people
20th-century African-American women